Statistics in basketball are kept to evaluate a player's or a team's performance.

Examples
Examples of basketball statistics include:

 GM, GP; GS: games played; games started
 PTS: points
 FGM, FGA, FG%: field goals made, attempted and percentage
 FTM, FTA, FT%: free throws made, attempted and percentage
 3FGM, 3FGA, 3FG%: three-point field goals made, attempted and percentage
 REB, OREB, DREB: rebounds, offensive rebounds, defensive rebounds
 AST: assists
 STL: steals
 BLK: blocks
 TO: turnovers
 TD: triple double
 EFF: efficiency: NBA's efficiency rating: (PTS + REB + AST + STL + BLK − ((FGA − FGM) + (FTA − FTM) + TO))
 PF: personal fouls
 MIN: minutes
 AST/TO: assist to turnover ratio
 PER: Player Efficiency Rating: John Hollinger's Player Efficiency Rating
 PIR: Performance Index Rating: Euroleague's and Eurocup's Performance Index Rating: (Points + Rebounds + Assists + Steals + Blocks + Fouls Drawn) − (Missed Field Goals + Missed Free Throws + Turnovers + Shots Rejected + Fouls Committed)

Averages per game are denoted by *PG (e.g. BLKPG or BPG, STPG or SPG, APG, RPG and MPG). Sometime the players statistics are divided by minutes played and multiplied by 48 minutes (had he played the entire game), denoted by * per 48 min. or *48M.

A player who makes double digits in a game in any two of the PTS, REB, AST, STL, and BLK statistics is said to make a double double; in three statistics, a triple double; in four statistics, a quadruple double.  A quadruple double is extremely rare (and has only occurred four times in the NBA).  There is also a 5x5, when a player records at least a 5 in each of the 5 statistics.

The NBA also posts to the statistics section of its Web site a simple composite efficiency statistic, denoted EFF and derived by the formula, ((Points + Rebounds + Assists + Steals + Blocks) − ((Field Goals Attempted − Field Goals Made) + (Free Throws Attempted − Free Throws Made) + Turnovers)). While conveniently distilling most of a player's key statistics in one numerical score, the formula is not highly regarded by the statistics community, with the alternative Player Efficiency Rating developed by ESPN basketball statistician John Hollinger being more widely used to compare the overall efficiency of players.

Tempo-free statistics
Examples of tempo-free statistics including the following
 Pace: Possessions per game (typically ranges from 60 to 75)
 PPP: Points per possession, the points a team score for each possession regardless of a team's pace
 TO%: Turnover percentage, the measure of how often a team loses possession of the ball before creating a scoring opportunity

Fantasy leagues
In fantasy basketball, statistics are used in a formula as the measurement of a player's performance.

See also
 Player Efficiency Rating
 Efficiency (basketball)
 Similarity score
 Advanced statistics in basketball

References

External links
 Proballers.com
 Basketball-Reference.com
 Statistics at NBA.com
 
 A Layman's Guide to Advanced NBA Statistics at knickerblogger.net
 NBA stats at Yahoo!

 
Statistics-related lists